Harry Steele may refer to:

Harry Steele (businessman) (1929–2022), Canadian businessman
Harry L. Steele (1874–1938), U.S. Army officer

See also
Harry Steel (disambiguation)
Harry Steele-Bodger (1896–1952), British veterinary surgeon
Harrison Steele (born 2002), Australian professional footballer